The D11 motorway is a highway in the Czech Republic.

Plans to build a highway connecting Prague and Hradec Králové date from 1938; construction finally began in 1978. Today it consists of one continuous segment Praha - Poděbrady - Libice nad Cidlinou - Libčany - Plačice - Plotiště - Smiřice - Jaroměř and last segment Jaroměř - Trutnov - border CZ/PL (polish expressway S3) is planned and waits for permits.
It is part of European route E67 "Via Baltica" from Prague in the Czech Republic to Helsinki in Finland by way of Poland, Lithuania, Latvia, and Estonia. Three lanes in each direction are planned by 2025 between Prague and Jirny (8 km) and to Poděbrady after 2025.

Unfinished sections

Images

References

D11